The Presidents Club Charitable Trust was a British charity known for an annual charity dinner held from 1985 to 2018. The dinner, held usually at The Dorchester hotel in London, was for male guests only and was considered a "mainstay of London's social calendar". After the Financial Times reported on sexual misconduct at the 2018 dinner, the charity announced its intent to disband.

The charitable trust's joint chairmen as of 2018 were the property developer Bruce Ritchie and the businessman and Department for Education director David Meller.

Charity dinners
The 360 guests at the annual dinners, all men, included leading figures in business, entertainment and politics. They would pay for a dinner and participate in auctions of such prizes as meetings with influential people. The proceeds would go to charities, including children's charities, and other organisations, for example the British Olympic Association and Disability Rights International.

In 2008, guests at the dinner organised by Harvey Goldsmith  included Jimmy Savile, Justin King, Harold Tillman and Robert Tchenguiz.

In 2010, guests at the dinner organised by Peter Shalson and sponsored by HSBC included Len Blavatnik, Mike Sherwood, Charles Dunstone, Sir Martin Sorrell, Richard Desmond, Bernie Ecclestone, Flavio Briatore, Nick Candy, David Reuben, Gerald Ronson, Howard Shore, Harvey Goldsmith, Jarvis Astaire, Jimmy Lahoud, Dan Wagner and Jimmy Tarbuck.

2018 sexual harassment controversy
In January 2018, the Financial Times sent two undercover reporters to join the 130 scantily clad "hostesses" specially hired for the event by the  Artista agency. It reported that several of the guests had sexually harassed or assaulted the hostesses in the course of the evening. The lead reporter, Madison Marriage, wrote that the hostesses were subject to groping, lewd comments, requests to join guests in their bedrooms, questions whether they were prostitutes, and that one attendee exposed his penis to a hostess. Marriage said that she herself had been groped several times. The event's brochure included a full-page warning that harassment would not be tolerated, and that the Presidents Club would not be liable for it if it did happen.

The report caused a scandal in the United Kingdom, and commentators connected the event to the #MeToo movement, the Harvey Weinstein scandal and resulting allegations indicating frequent sexual abuse of women. Within a day, the Presidents Club announced that it would disband. Some MPs called for the resignation of children and families minister Nadhim Zahawi, who had been among the guests, as well as for a police investigation of the event. Presidents Club co-chairman David Meller resigned from his Department of Education directorship. Jonathan Mendelsohn, another of the guests, was removed from the Labour frontbench in the House of Lords. Several bookshops stopped the sale of books by the comedian David Walliams, who had hosted the event and put up the right to name a character in his next book as a prize. All of these men said to the media that they had neither participated in nor witnessed any misconduct.

The guest list of the 2018 dinner included the following other notable men (although they did not necessarily attend):

Liam Botham, rugby player
Richard Caring, businessman
Gino D'Acampo, celebrity chef
Christopher Evans, biotechnology entrepreneur
Philip Green, retail executive
George Holmes, university executive
Peter Jones, Dragons' Den star
Vernon Kay, TV presenter
Jimmy Lahoud, restaurateur
Brett Palos, property developer
Theo Paphitis, Dragons' Den star
Harry Primrose, Lord Dalmeny, deputy chairman of Sotheby's UK
Rami Ranger, founder of Sun Mark
Bruce Ritchie, property developer
Peter Shalson, property developer
Tim Steiner, co-founder and CEO of Ocado
Touker Suleyman, fashion entrepreneur
Robert Tchenguiz, businessman
Ceawlin Thynn, Viscount Weymouth, businessman
Dan Wagner, Internet entrepreneur
Poju Zabludowicz, businessman

References

External links

Charity events in the United Kingdom
1985 establishments in the United Kingdom
2018 disestablishments in the United Kingdom
January 2018 events in the United Kingdom
Violence against women in England
2018 scandals
Organizations established in 1985
Organizations disestablished in 2018
Sexual harassment in the United Kingdom